Desisa subfasciata is a species of beetle in the family Cerambycidae. It was described by Francis Polkinghorne Pascoe in 1862. It is known from India, Vietnam, Japan, China, Nepal, Cambodia, and Sumatra.

Varietas
 Desisa subfasciata var. infasciata (Pic, 1944)
 Desisa subfasciata var. latefasciata (Pic, 1924)

References

Desisa
Beetles described in 1862